O. fragilis may refer to:
 Omphalotropis fragilis, a gastropod species endemic to Micronesia
 Ophiothrix fragilis, an echinoderm species in the genus Ophiothrix
 Opuntia fragilis, the brittle prickly pear or little prickly pear, a cactus species  native to much of North America

See also
 Fragilis (disambiguation)